Gradac is a village in Bosnia and Herzegovina. According to the 1991 census, the village is located in the municipality of Posušje.

Demographics 
According to the 2013 census, its population was 801.

Notable people 

 Borna Sosa, Croatian footballer (parents originating from Gradac)

References

Populated places in Posušje